Anthidium aymara is a species of bee in the family Megachilidae, the leaf-cutter, carder, or mason bees.

Distribution
Chile

References

aymara
Insects described in 1998
Endemic fauna of Chile